The Florida Keys Keynoter is a twice-weekly broadsheet format newspaper owned by The McClatchy Company and is a subsidiary of the Miami Herald. It primarily serves Monroe county in the U.S. state of Florida. In addition to publishing regular issues on Wednesday and Saturday, the Keynoter also publishes the quarterly magazine Unwind. The Keynoter is a partner of the Upper Keys Reporter, which specializes in coverage of the Upper Florida Keys, including Key Largo.

The newspaper employs approximately two dozen people in two offices across Monroe County. The offices located in Marathon and Tavernier, work with the Miami Herald to provide complete coverage of the Florida Keys and southern Florida. The newspaper has been continually among the best in the state, repeatedly earning awards from the Florida Press Association for design and newswriting. The newspaper's coverage of fishing in the Florida Keys and surrounding waters has been repeatedly praised, and special fishing sections regularly feature columns and tips from local fishermen.

History 

The Keynoter was founded by Edgar Seney Jr., on February 19, 1953. Seney, a regular vacationer from his home state of Michigan, felt the Keys were missing a platform to inform residents about happenings and issues affecting the Florida Keys. Until that point, the only daily newspaper in the Florida Keys had been the Key West Citizen, which was and still is primarily concerned with events in Key West. Upon moving to the Florida Keys on a permanent basis, Seney began work on a newspaper that would eventually become the Keynoter.

The first issue was published from a small Marathon office operated by Seney, his wife, and half a dozen other workers. Initially published on a weekly basis, Seney accepted a college fellowship in 1955, selling the newspaper to Nicholas Mitchell, associate editor of the Greenville, South Carolina, newspaper.

In 1956, James L. Knight, one of the founders of the Knight-Ridder newspaper group, purchased the Keynoter. The Keynoter would remain a Knight-Ridder newspaper until 2006, when Knight-Ridder was purchased by rival newspaper group The McClatchy Company.

The Keynoter did not come into its own, however, until Hurricane Donna ravaged the Florida Keys in September 1960. In the wake of the destruction caused by the hurricane, and to better provide coverage of the devastation, the Keynoter temporarily merged resources with the Florida Keys Sun, a weekly newspaper located in Islamorada. The two newspapers published joint editions for three weeks until splitting once more. After only one month of separate operation, however, the two papers merged permanently under the Keynoter name.

The post-merger Keynoter operated an Upper Keys bureau in the former Sun offices until 1977, when the bureau was moved to Key Largo, where it today occupies the second floor of the Upper Keys Reporter building. In 1984, the Keynoter switched to a twice-weekly Wednesday and Saturday publication schedule under the motto "Everyone needs it twice a week." The Keynoter continues to use this publication schedule and motto today.

In 2000, the bi-weekly schedule was bolstered by the addition of L'Attitudes, a weekly arts and entertainment insert included in the Saturday edition of the Keynoter. Also in 2000, the Keynoter launched the Key West Keynoter, a Key West-oriented edition of the Keynoter, specifically written and designed to appeal to readers in Key West, the most populous city in the Florida Keys.

Awards 

In 2007, the Keynoter received several awards from the Florida Press Association. In the categories of "special section" and "serious column," the Keynoter earned second place in the 7,000 - 15,000 circulation division. It earned third place in the website and community service categories, also in the 7,000 - 15,000 division.

These awards followed on the heels of its 2006 first-place finishes in the categories of general excellence, hurricane coverage, opinion section, web site, environmental writing, and sports column. In all of these categories, the Florida Press Association declared the Keynoter the best newspaper in the state of Florida in the 7,000 - 15,000 circulation division. That year, the Keynoter also received awards for in-depth reporting (2nd), outdoors reporting (2nd), obituary writing (3rd), editorial (2nd), serious column (3rd), and news story (honorable mention).

In 2006 and 2007, Florida Monthly magazine named the Keynoter the best weekly newspaper in the state of Florida.

The Florida Keys Keynoter is also the only Florida newspaper, daily, weekly, or otherwise, to win the First Amendment Defense Award three separate times.

References

External links

 
 
  Florida Keys Keynoter issues freely available through the Florida Digital Newspaper Library

Newspapers published in Florida
McClatchy publications
Knight Ridder
Newspapers established in 1953
Mass media in Key West, Florida
1953 establishments in Florida